The following lists events that happened in 1912 in El Salvador.

Incumbents
President: Manuel Enrique Araujo
Vice President: Onofre Durán

Events

May

 27 May –  The current Flag of El Salvador was adopted.

September

 15 September –  The current Coat of arms of El Salvador was adopted.

Undated

 The National Guard of El Salvador was established by President Manuel Enrique Araujo.

References

 
El Salvador
1910s in El Salvador
Years of the 20th century in El Salvador
El Salvador